Will There Be Spring is an album by Norwegian singer-songwriter Maria Solheim released in 2006 by Kirkelig Kulturverksted (FXCD 309).

Background 
This is Solheims fourth solo album release, including a collection of original songs.

Track listing 
(All songs and lyrics by Maria Solheim where not otherwise noted. Arranged by – Emil Nikolaisen & Maria Solheim)
 "Moonlight" (0:55)
 "Wildest Day" (3:09)
 "Where Do People Go" (2:28) – written by Olav Hynnekleiv
 "All My Thoughts" (3:30)
 "Ocean Needs Water" (2:31)
 "Different Seasons" (3:33)
 "Take My Heart Revisited" (3:44)
 "Burn The Books" (3:29)
 "Juice" (3:40) – middle section written by Emil Nikolaisen
 "You – Every Morning" (3:11)
 "Mountain Song" (2:09)

Musicians
David Wallumrød – Piano (tracks 1 & 2), Clavinet (track 3)
Remi Christiansen – Pedalsteel Guitar (track 1)
Emil Nikolaisen – Guitar & Percussion (track 2)
Martin Winstad – Congas (track 2)
Fredrik Brarud – Drums (track 3)
Tor Egil Kreken – Double Bass & Banjo (track 3)
Olav Hynnekleiv – Vocals (track 3)
Maria Solheim – Solo Guitar (track 3), Guitar, Vocals

Notes 
Mastered by Bjørn Engelmann
Mixed by Christian Engfelt
Producer Emil Nikolaisen
Recorded by Cato Thomassen, Christian Engfelt & Nikolai Eilertsen
Record Assistant Espen Høydalsvik

References

External links 
Maria Solheim 'Ocean needs water' on YouTube

Maria Solheim albums
2006 albums